Édouard Michut (born 4 March 2003) is a French professional footballer who plays as a midfielder for EFL Championship club Sunderland, on loan from Ligue 1 club Paris Saint-Germain.

Club career

Early career
Born in Aix-les-Bains in southeastern France, Michut played for FC Le Chesnay 78 from September 2009 to October 2011. He then moved to Versailles, which he stayed at until June 2015, before joining the academy of Paris Saint-Germain in July 2016. He has been named the "new Verratti" (and also by some as "new Messi") in France due to his technical ability and tactical versatility, and has attracted the attention of major clubs, namely Manchester City, Juventus, Barcelona and Valencia.

Paris Saint-Germain
On 23 July 2020, Michut signed his first professional contract with Paris Saint-Germain (PSG), a deal lasting until 2023. He made his debut in a 4–0 Ligue 1 win over Dijon on 27 February 2021, coming on as a substitute for Danilo Pereira at the 89th minute of the match. On 18 June 2021, Michut extended his contract with PSG to 2025.

On 18 August 2021, Michut was sent back to train with the under-19 squad coached by Zoumana Camara. He made his first appearance of the 2021–22 season as a substitute in a 3–0 Coupe de France win over Feignies Aulnoye on 19 December, and made his first professional start in a 4–0 win over Vannes on 3 January 2022 in the same competition. On 9 January 2022, Michut made his first league appearance of the season, coming on as a substitute for Ander Herrera in a 1–1 draw away to Lyon. In the match, he recorded his first career assist, a pass for Thilo Kehrer's 76th-minute equalizer. At the age of 18 years and 311 days, he became the youngest player to contribute an assist for Paris Saint-Germain since Kylian Mbappé (18 years and 298 days) in a match against Dijon on 14 October 2017. On 20 April 2022, Michut received a red card in a 3–0 win over Angers. After having been tackled, he struck Romain Thomas's tibia "on accident" according to PSG manager Mauricio Pochettino. By participating in five league matches for Paris Saint-Germain in the 2021–22 season, Michut became a Ligue 1 champion.

On 6 July 2022, a meeting was scheduled at the Camp des Loges between Michut and Luís Campos, PSG's new Football Advisor, to discuss the player's future at the club. However, Michut did not show up to the meeting. He had not been named in the club's squad for the start of pre-season on 4 July, and had instead been placed in a separate session for youth players starting on 12 July. A new meeting between Michut and Campos occurred on 7 July, in which Campos gave Michut a warning due to his behavior. Before the end of the meeting, Michut was made to sign a paper acting as a call to order.

Loan to Sunderland
On 31 August 2022, Michut joined EFL Championship club Sunderland on a season-long loan deal, with the club holding an option to make the deal permanent at the end of the season.

International career 
Michut is a youth international for France, representing his nation at under-16, under-17, and under-19 level.

Personal life
Michut's younger brother, Étienne, signed an “aspiring” youth contract with PSG in April 2021.

Career statistics

Honours 
Paris Saint-Germain

 Ligue 1: 2021–22

References

External links
 
 
 

2003 births
Living people
French footballers
People from Aix-les-Bains
Sportspeople from Savoie
Footballers from Auvergne-Rhône-Alpes
Association football midfielders
FC Versailles 78 players
Paris Saint-Germain F.C. players
Sunderland A.F.C. players
Ligue 1 players
France youth international footballers
French expatriate footballers
Expatriate footballers in England
French expatriate sportspeople in England